Galathea strigosa is a species of squat lobster found in the northeast Atlantic Ocean, from the Nordkapp to the Canary Islands, and in the Mediterranean Sea and Red Sea. It is edible, but not fished commercially.

References

External links
 

Squat lobsters
Crustaceans of the Atlantic Ocean
Crustaceans described in 1761
Edible crustaceans
Taxa named by Carl Linnaeus